Events in the year 2023 in Namibia.

Incumbents 

 President: Hage Geingob
 Vice President: Nangolo Mbumba
 Prime Minister: Saara Kuugongelwa
 Deputy Prime Minister: Netumbo Nandi-Ndaitwah
 Chief Justice: Peter Shivute

Events 
Ongoing – COVID-19 pandemic in Namibia

 31 January – The Namibian environment ministry announces that 61 black rhinoceros and 26 white rhinoceros were killed in the country in 2022 as a result of poaching, forty-six of whom were in Etosha National Park.

References 

 
2020s in Namibia
Years of the 21st century in Namibia
Namibia
Namibia